Stephen, Steven, or Steve Kent may refer to:
 Stephen Kent (musician), didgeridoo/ambient musician
 Stephen Kent (network security) (born 1951), American pioneer of network security systems, recipient of Internet Hall of Fame
 Stephen A. Kent, Canadian religious scholar
 Stephen Kent (chemist) (born 1945), University of Chicago chemist
 Steven Kent (television producer), American television writer and producer
 Steven Kent (swimmer) (born 1988), New Zealand swimmer
 Steven Kent (baseball) (born 1989), Australian professional baseball player
 Steven L. Kent (born 1960), American author and reporter known for his coverage of video games
 Steve Kent (politician) (born 1978), Canadian politician, member of the Newfoundland and Labrador House of Assembly for Mount Pearl North
 Steve Kent (baseball) (born 1978), German-born baseball player
 Steve Kent (Home and Away), fictional character on the Australian soap opera Home and Away
 Stephen Kent (astronomer), American astronomer and discoverer of minor planets